GEROVA Financial Group, Ltd is an international reinsurance company with operating insurance subsidiaries in Bermuda, Barbados, and Ireland.

Acquisitions and name changes 
Gerova was previously named Asia Special Situations Acquisition Corporation.  The name was changed in February 2010.

As Asia Special Situations Acquisition Corporation, the company attempted to acquire White Energy, an Australian coal mining firm, in 2009.
However, that deal did not occur.

On December 7, 2010, Gerova announced agreements, subject to approval, to acquire Seymour Pierce, a small London investment bank and Ticonderoga Securities, a New York securities broker. If the transactions close, Gerova would use the Seymour Pierce name.

References

Companies listed on the New York Stock Exchange
Reinsurance companies
Insurance companies of the Cayman Islands